Baikin or Baykin (from бaйка meaning fable) is a Russian masculine surname, its feminine counterpart is Baikina or Baikina.

Russian-language surnames